Mark A. Nelson was born in 1957 and is a native of St. James, Minnesota, US.
Col. Mark A. Nelson was the superintendent of the North Dakota Highway Patrol. He became a member of the highway patrol in 1981 in Rolla, ND and Devils Lake, ND. In 1988, he became a patrol officer in Grand Forks and was promoted to sergeant in 1989. He was then a graduate of the Northwestern University Traffic Institute's School of Police Staff and Command (1991). He was promoted to captain in 1996 as a district commander, and as superintendent in 2007, with a promotion to colonel. He graduated from Park University in Parkville, Missouri in 2002.

References

Living people
State cabinet secretaries of North Dakota
Park University alumni
People from St. James, Minnesota
Year of birth missing (living people)
American state police officers
American police chiefs